Solon Springs Municipal Airport  is a public use airport located three nautical miles (6 km) south of the central business district of Solon Springs, in Douglas County, Wisconsin, United States. It is included in the Federal Aviation Administration (FAA) National Plan of Integrated Airport Systems for 2021–2025, in which it is categorized as a basic general aviation facility.

Although many U.S. airports use the same three-letter location identifier for the FAA and IATA, this facility is assigned OLG by the FAA but has no designation from the IATA.

Facilities and aircraft 
Solon Springs Municipal Airport covers an area of 128 acres (52 ha) at an elevation of 1,102 feet (336 m) above mean sea level. It has one runway designated 1/19 with an asphalt surface measuring 3,099 by 60 feet (945 x 18 m), with an approved GPS approach. It also has one heliport with an asphalt surface measuring 40 by 40 feet.

For the 12-month period ending July 29, 2021, the airport had 4,525 aircraft operations, an average of 12 per day: 99% general aviation and less than 1% air taxi. In January 2023, there were 15 aircraft based at this airport: all 15 single-engine.

See also 
 List of airports in Wisconsin

References

External links 
 Solon Springs Municipal Airport
  at Wisconsin DOT Airport Directory
 

Airports in Wisconsin
Transportation in Douglas County, Wisconsin